Bahrenborstel is a municipality in the district of Diepholz, in Lower Saxony, Germany.

It lies between the Dümmer Nature Park and the Steinhuder Nature Park, and roughly between Bremen and Minden. Approximately 7 km south of the community is the Great Moor. A few kilometers northwest runs a section of the Great Aue.

References 

Diepholz (district)